Kang Minchul (born 16 March 1973) is a South Korean yongmudo practitioner (Grand Master) and a professor in the Department of Oriental Martial Arts at Yong In University. He is the manager of the Korean Yongmudo Association (KYA).

References 

Living people
Yongmudo practitioners
1973 births
South Korean male martial artists